The 2007 Democratic Progressive Party presidential primary was the selection process by which the Democratic Progressive Party of the Republic of China (Taiwan) chose its candidate for the 2008 presidential election. The DPP candidate for president was selected through a series of member of the party in Thursday, 19 April 2007.

Result

2007 elections in Taiwan
Democratic Progressive Party
Primary elections in Taiwan